Samuel McAllister (January 23, 1869 – December 13, 1903) was an American sailor serving in the United States Navy who received the Medal of Honor for his actions during the Boxer Rebellion.

Biography
McAllister was born January 23, 1869, in Belfast, Ireland, and after entering the Navy was sent as an Ordinary Seaman to China to fight in the Boxer Rebellion.

His Medal was presented to him by President Theodore Roosevelt and his Medal of Honor was accredited to the state California.

Medal of Honor citation
Rank and organization: Ordinary Seaman, U.S. Navy. Born: 23 January 1869, Belfast, Ireland. Accredited to: California. G.O. No.: 84, 22 March 1902.

Citation:

In action against the enemy at Tientsin, China, 20 June 1900. Crossing the river in a small boat while under heavy enemy fire, McAllister assisted in destroying buildings occupied by the enemy.

See also

List of Medal of Honor recipients for the Boxer Rebellion

References

 

1869 births
1903 deaths
19th-century Irish people
American military personnel of the Boxer Rebellion
Boxer Rebellion recipients of the Medal of Honor
Irish sailors in the United States Navy
Irish emigrants to the United States (before 1923)
Irish-born Medal of Honor recipients
Military personnel from Belfast
United States Navy Medal of Honor recipients
United States Navy sailors
People lost at sea